"Christmas Saves the Year" is a Christmas single written and recorded by American musical duo Twenty One Pilots. Released on December 8, 2020, during the COVID-19 pandemic through Fueled by Ramen, "Christmas Saves the Year" expresses the idea that even in a turbulent year, optimism can still be found in Christmas.

Background 

"Christmas Saves the Year" was written, composed and recorded in lead singer Tyler Joseph's home studio. Twenty One Pilots debuted the track at the end of a Twitch stream in which lead singer Tyler Joseph played in the Chipotle Challenger Fortnite series tournament to raise money for the Make-A-Wish Foundation, after having teased "a gift" for the viewers of the stream.

Originally reluctant to write a Christmas song, Joseph was inspired as he was "experiencing Christmas through a little girl's perspective", in reference to his daughter, Rosie Joseph. The sound of the track was inspired by a musical instrument called the Mellotron.

Composition 
"Christmas Saves the Year" is a lo-fi Christmas song. Joseph wrote the song from the perspective of his "friends who live in some bigger cities that have these small apartments", and are "trying to weigh the options of whether or not they should see their family this year."

Music video 
Following the end of frontman Tyler Joseph's Twitch stream, the song and its visualizer video were released and made available on music-streaming services, and a premiere for the video was placed onto YouTube. The video was directed and animated by Johnny Chew. An official music video for the song was released on December 8, 2021, one year after the song was released, and heavily utilizes claymation. It was directed and animated by Mr. Oz.

Charts

References 

2020 singles
2020 songs
Songs written by Tyler Joseph
Twenty One Pilots songs
American Christmas songs
Songs about the COVID-19 pandemic
Fueled by Ramen singles